Audrey Guérit (born 1 March 1976) is a French former swimmer who competed in the 1992 Summer Olympics.

References

1976 births
Living people
French female breaststroke swimmers
Olympic swimmers of France
Swimmers at the 1992 Summer Olympics
Mediterranean Games gold medalists for France
Mediterranean Games medalists in swimming
Swimmers at the 1993 Mediterranean Games